A telluric current (from Latin tellūs, "earth"), or Earth current, is an electric current which moves underground or through the sea. Telluric currents result from both natural causes and human activity, and the discrete currents interact in a complex pattern. The currents are extremely low frequency and travel over large areas at or near the surface of the Earth.

Description
Telluric currents are phenomena observed in the Earth's crust and mantle. In September 1862, an experiment to specifically address Earth currents was carried out in the Munich Alps (Lamont, 1862). Including minor processes, there are at least 32 different mechanisms which cause telluric currents. The strongest are primarily geomagnetically induced currents, which are induced by changes in the outer part of the Earth's magnetic field, which are usually caused by interactions between the solar wind and the magnetosphere or solar radiation effects on the ionosphere. Telluric currents flow in the surface layers of the earth. The electric potential on the Earth's surface can be measured at different points, enabling the calculation of the magnitudes and directions of the telluric currents and hence the Earth's conductance. These currents are known to have diurnal characteristics wherein the general direction of flow is towards the sun. Telluric currents continuously move between the sunlit and shadowed sides of the earth, toward the equator on the side of the earth facing the sun (that is, during the day), and toward the poles on the night side of the planet.

Both telluric and magnetotelluric methods are used for exploring the structure beneath the Earth's surface (such as in industrial prospecting).  For mineral exploration the targets are any subsurface structures with a distinguishable resistance in comparison to its surroundings.  Uses include geothermal exploration, mining exploration, petroleum exploration, mapping of fault zones, ground water exploration and monitoring, investigation of magma chambers, and investigation of boundaries of tectonic plates. Earth batteries tap a useful low voltage current from telluric currents and were used for telegraph systems as far back as the 1840s.

In industrial prospecting activity that uses the telluric current method, electrodes are properly located on the ground to sense the voltage difference between locations caused by the oscillatory telluric currents. It is recognized that a low frequency window (LFW) exists when telluric currents pass through the earth's substrata. In the frequencies of the LFW, the earth acts as a conductor.

In fiction
The main plot of the 1988 novel Foucault's Pendulum by Umberto Eco revolves around conspiracy theorists who believe they are searching for the Umbilicus Mundi (Latin: "The Navel of the World"), the mystic "Center of The Earth" which is supposed to be a certain point from where a person could control the energies and shapes of the Earth, thus reforming it at will. The novel takes this even further by suggesting that (in the view of the conspiratorialists) monuments like the Eiffel Tower are nothing more than giant antennas related to these energies.

Telluric currents, along what are effectively ley lines, are discovered to be a means of mysterious communication in Thomas Pynchon's 1997 novel, Mason & Dixon, and are associated with the book's Chinese-Jesuit subplot. As with Eco, cited above, Pynchon also reflects upon Hollow Earth theories in this work.

See also

References

Further reading

External links
 MTNet, Scientists engaged in the study of the Earth using electromagnetic methods, principally the magnetotelluric technique (magnetotellurics).

Geophysics
Enochian magic